Bornu Yassa is a town in Borno State, north-east Nigeria near Titiwa, some 80 kilometres south of the border with Niger.  As of 2007 it had an estimated population of 5,987.

References

Populated places in Borno State